The 2015 Trans-Am Series was the 47th running of the Sports Car Club of America's Trans Am Series. Amy Ruman won an impressive 8 races, and made history for the second time by becoming the first woman ever to win a Trans Am Series Championship, in addition to her unprecedented first win in 2011.

Schedule
The schedule was released December 5, 2014, and consists of twelve rounds.

Calendar and results
Source:

Driver standings

TA

TA2

TA3-I

TA3-A

References

Trans-Am Series
TransAm